The 2013 Rogers Cup presented by National Bank was a tennis tournament played on outdoor hard courts. It was the 124th edition (for the men) and the 112th (for the women) of the Canadian Open, and was part of the ATP World Tour Masters 1000 of the 2013 ATP World Tour, and of the WTA Premier 5 tournaments of the 2013 WTA Tour. The men's event was held at the Uniprix Stadium in Montreal, from August 3 to August 11 and the women's and legends events at the Rexall Centre in Toronto, from August 3 to August 11.

Points and prize money

Point distribution

Prize money
The total prize money pot for 2013 was $3,496,085, an increase of around $800,000 from the previous year.

ATP singles main-draw entrants

Seeds

 1Rankings are as of July 29, 2013

Other entrants
The following players received wild cards into the main singles draw:
  Frank Dancevic
  Jesse Levine
  Filip Peliwo
  Vasek Pospisil

The following players received entry from the singles qualifying draw:
  Benjamin Becker
  Alex Bogomolov Jr.
  David Goffin
  Lu Yen-hsun
  Marinko Matosevic
  Peter Polansky
  Amir Weintraub

Withdrawals
Before the tournament
  Marin Čilić (drug suspension)
  Roger Federer (back injury)
  Mardy Fish (personal reasons)
  Juan Mónaco
  Gaël Monfils (ankle injury)
  Sam Querrey
  Tommy Robredo
  Viktor Troicki (drug suspension)
  Jo-Wilfried Tsonga (left knee injury)

Retirements
  Nikolay Davydenko (bronchitis)
  Tommy Haas (shoulder injury)
  Jarkko Nieminen (hamstring injury)

ATP doubles main-draw entrants

Seeds

 Rankings are as of July 29, 2013

Other entrants
The following pairs received wildcards into the doubles main draw:
  Frank Dancevic /  Adil Shamasdin
  Jesse Levine /  Vasek Pospisil

The following pair received entry as alternates:
  Jérémy Chardy /  Łukasz Kubot

Withdrawals
Before the tournament
  Vasek Pospisil (shoulder injury)
During the tournament
  Pablo Andújar (hip injury)
  Tommy Haas (shoulder injury)

WTA singles main-draw entrants

Seeds

 Rankings are as of July 29, 2013

Other entrants
The following players received wild cards into the main singles draw:
  Victoria Azarenka
  Marion Bartoli
  Eugenie Bouchard
  Stéphanie Dubois
  Sharon Fichman

The following players received entry from the singles qualifying draw:
  Kiki Bertens
  Jana Čepelová
  Lauren Davis
  Alexandra Dulgheru
  Julia Glushko
  Petra Martić
  Alison Riske
  Anastasia Rodionova
  Olga Savchuk
  Chanelle Scheepers
  Anna Tatishvili
  Carol Zhao

The following players received entry as lucky losers:
  Svetlana Kuznetsova
  Bethanie Mattek-Sands
  Ayumi Morita

Withdrawals
Before the tournament
  Victoria Azarenka (low back injury)
  Simona Halep
  Bojana Jovanovski
  Kaia Kanepi (change of scheduling)
  Sabine Lisicki
  Romina Oprandi
  Laura Robson (right wrist injury)
  Peng Shuai (visa)
  Nadia Petrova (left leg injury)
  Maria Sharapova (hip injury)

Retirements
  Marion Bartoli

WTA doubles main-draw entrants

Seeds

 Rankings are as of July 29, 2013

Other entrants
The following pairs received wildcards into the doubles main draw:
  Eugenie Bouchard /  Kirsten Flipkens
  Gabriela Dabrowski /  Sharon Fichman
  Daniela Hantuchová /  Martina Hingis 
  Angelique Kerber /  Petra Kvitová
The following pair received entry as alternates:
  Sandra Klemenschits /  Olga Savchuk

Withdrawals
Before the tournament
  Laura Robson (right wrist injury)

Finals

Men's singles

 Rafael Nadal defeated  Milos Raonic, 6–2, 6–2

Women's singles

 Serena Williams defeated  Sorana Cîrstea 6–2, 6–0

Men's doubles

 Alexander Peya /  Bruno Soares defeated  Colin Fleming /  Andy Murray, 6–4, 7–6(7–4)

Women's doubles

 Jelena Janković /  Katarina Srebotnik defeated  Anna-Lena Grönefeld /  Květa Peschke, 5–7, 6–1, [10–6]

References

External links
Official website

 
2013 ATP World Tour
2013 WTA Tour
2013 in Canadian tennis
August 2013 sports events in Canada
2013